was a town located in Onyū District, Fukui Prefecture, Japan.

As of 2003, the town had an estimated population of 8,270 and a density of 100.76 persons per km². The total area was 82.08 km².

On March 31, 2005, Kaminaka, along with the town of Mikata (from Mikata District), was merged to create the town of Wakasa (in the newly created Mikatakaminaka District).

External links
 Wakasa official website 

Dissolved municipalities of Fukui Prefecture
Wakasa, Fukui